Robert Sayle was the founder of a department store located in Cambridge.

History
Robert Sayle was born in Southery, Norfolk in 1816. His father was a farmer; however, Robert did not continue in his father's footsteps and moved to London to learn the drapery trade with well known firms, such as Hitchcock, Williams & Co who were based near St Paul's Cathedral.

In 1840, he returned to Cambridge and with assistance from his father he set a drapery business located in Victoria House, 12 St Andrew's Street. The business sold Irish Linens, Sheeting, Hosiery, Haberdashery, Furs, Shawls, Handkerchiefs, Ribbons and Fancy Goods. The store was cutting edge for its time, as plate glass windows had been added to the store front to display the shop's goods.

The business continued to grow purchasing the shops along St Andrew's Street and by 1888 the store had grown up to no. 17. However, Robert Sayle died of a heart attack in 1883, and the business continued to be run as a private business by partners, Joseph Clark, Arthur Edward Chaplin and Hugh Porter who greatly expanded the departments.

The business continued to operate as an independent business until 1934, when Selfridges purchased the business. However, five years later Selfridges sold off its provincial stores and Robert Sayle was bought by the John Lewis Partnership. They also acquired Thompsons of Peterborough from Selfridges, which was rebranded under the Robert Sayle name in 1941. The Peterborough store was destroyed by fire in 1956 and not re-opened.

The store continued to trade at St Andrew's Street under the Robert Sayle name until 2004, when the store was moved to a temporary location in Burleigh Street. This was to facilitate the demolition of the St Andrew's Street store to make way for the Grand Arcade shopping centre. The Grand Arcade opened in November 2007, with the anchor store being the new John Lewis Cambridge. The partners at Robert Sayle had voted to drop the old name and start afresh with the John Lewis name.

Robert Sayle's youngest son, Charles Edward Sayle, was a noted poet, literary scholar and librarian.

References

British companies established in 1840
Retail companies established in 1840
Retail companies disestablished in 2007
Shops in Cambridge
History of Cambridge
Sayle Robert
Defunct retail companies of the United Kingdom
Sayle Robert
Sayle Robert